Likas is a sub-district in the city of Kota Kinabalu, Malaysia. Likas is known for where shopping complex, government and private hospital, universities and colleges such as Universiti Malaysia Sabah and government administration centre is located. Likas Sports Complex together with Sabah Women and Child Hospital is also located here. The area also mostly covered by housing estate such as the Likas Village. Likas is also a bustling metropolitan area where new high skyscrapers buildings have recently flourished.

The area is also known for its beaches, the "Tanjung Lipat or Likas Bay", a coastal line stretching about 7 kilometres from the city port until the Tun Mustapha Tower. Along the bay is the coastal road that connects much of the city parts together with a jogging and cycling trek as well with an open space eateries known locally as "Anjung Selera" that was open until late night. International dragon boat race is held every year in the bay.

References 

Kota Kinabalu